Henri Jacques Chrétien (1 February 1879, Paris – 6 February 1956, Washington, D.C.) was a French astronomer and an inventor.

 
Born in Paris, France, his most famous inventions are:
- the anamorphic widescreen process, using an anamorphic lens system called Hypergonar, that resulted in the CinemaScope widescreen technique, and 
- the co-invention, with George Willis Ritchey, of the Ritchey–Chrétien telescope, an improved type of astronomical telescope, employing a system now used in virtually all large research telescopes.

He spent part of his early astronomical career at the Nice Observatory, which was close to his house, the Villa Paradou. The Villa was built by famous French architect Charles Garnier who also built the Opera of Paris. In 1995, the abandoned villa was acquired by the artist Rainer Maria Latzke, who restored it and added new murals to the existing frescoes.

Chrétien was one of the founders of the Institut d'optique théorique et appliquée and professor at the French "grande école" SupOptique (École supérieure d'optique).

Awards and honors 
The astronomical Chrétien International Research Grants awards are in honor of him
 In 1901, Chrétien, Joseph Joachim Landerer and Thomas David Anderson jointly received the Prix Jules Janssen, the highest award of the Société astronomique de France (French Astronomical Society).
Valz Prize from the French Academy of Sciences (1931)
The crater Chrétien on the Moon is named in his honor. 
In 1955, he received an Academy Award for his work on the CinemaScope process.

Publications
ADS NASA
Library of Congress
Library of Congress

References

20th-century French inventors
French scientific instrument makers
Optical engineers
1879 births
1956 deaths
20th-century French astronomers
20th-century French engineers
Recipients of the Scientific and Technical Academy Award of Merit
CinemaScope
Scientists from Paris